Marieke is a 1988 statue in Bruges, Belgium, designed by . It is a homage to Jacques Brel's famous song Marieke.

History
The statue was built at the request of journalist and Brel fan, Johan Anthierens. It was revealed on 23 July 1988 by mayor .

On 1 February 2012, the statue was clothed with knitted sleeves by anonymous pranksters.

Statue
It depicts a young woman, Marieke, who lived "between the towers of Bruges and Ghent" according to Brel's song of the same name.

Sources

1988 sculptures
Statues of fictional characters
Sculptures of women
Bronze sculptures in Belgium
Statues in Belgium
Tourist attractions in Bruges
Buildings and structures in Bruges
Musical sculptures
Cultural depictions of Jacques Brel